is a Japanese judoka. He won the bronze medal in the lightweight (73 kg) division at the 2010 World Judo Championships.

External links
 

1988 births
Living people
Japanese male judoka
Japanese expatriates in Hungary
Universiade medalists in judo
Universiade gold medalists for Japan
Medalists at the 2011 Summer Universiade
Medalists at the 2009 Summer Universiade
20th-century Japanese people
21st-century Japanese people